The first season of Shark Tank India premiered on 20 December 2021 and concluded on 4 February 2022.

Format
The first season received 62,000 aspirants from India, out of which 198 businesses were selected to pitch their ideas to the "sharks". Out of 198 investment pitches at the reality TV show, 67 businesses got deals this season.

Sharks 
Any five of the following seven sharks are present in each episode except episodes 34–35.

Pitches and investments by sharks

Notes

 In Shark Tank India Season 1, approximately Rs. 42 crores was invested in 67 startups by the sharks.
 Later, in season 2, it was seen that JhaJi Achaar got a deal of ₹85 lakhs for 8.45% equity from Namita Thapar, Vineeta Singh & Jharkhand's Angels Network.

In popular culture
The sharks made a guest appearance in the thirteenth season of Kaun Banega Crorepati, and in The Kapil Sharma Show.

Shark Peyush Bansal pitched his company Lenskart on Shark Tank India to his co-sharks in the context of 2010.

Gateway to Shark Tank India
A special episode of Shark Tank India named Gateway to the Shark Tank streamed on 11 February 2022 on SonyLIV.

References

External links
 
 Shark Tank India on SonyLIV
 Shark Tank India on Sony Entertainment Television
 Shark Tank India Dataset on Kaggle

2021 Indian television series debuts
Sony Entertainment Television original programming